Lilburne is a surname. Notable people with the surname include:

 Cyril Lilburne (1902–1985), Australian footballer
 Elizabeth Lilburne (fl. 1641–1660), English political agitator; wife of John Lilburne
 George Lilburne (c. 1585–1666), English merchant
 Herb Lilburne (1908–1976), New Zealand rugby union and rugby league footballer
 John Lilburne (1614–1657), English political agitator
Paul Lilburne, Australian politician
 Robert Lilburne (1613–1665), English soldier and regicide; brother of John Lilburne
 Thomas Lilburne (died 1665), English politician

See also
 Lilburne River, New Zealand

Surnames of English origin